Costume designers are one a handful of artistic designers, whose personal and artistic choices determine the outcome of the overall visual look of a stage, film or television production.

Theater

 Willy Clarkson who designed costumes for London's West End theatre
 Theoni V. Aldredge: Annie, Barnum, A Chorus Line
 Bob Mackie: On the Town
 Desmond Heeley: Brigadoon
 Julie Taymor: The Lion King
 Gregg Barnes: Dirty Rotten Scoundrels
 Ann Roth: Assassins
 Jane Greenwood: The Scarlet Pimpernel, Once Upon a Mattress
 Santo Loquasto: Fosse, Ragtime
 Susan Hilferty: Wicked, Spring Awakening
 Ann Curtis: Jekyll & Hyde
 William Ivey Long: The Producers, Chicago
 Ann Hould-Ward: Beauty and the Beast, Dance of the Vampires
 Willa Kim: The Will Rogers Follies
 Jennifer von Mayrhauser: Rabbit Hole, Talley's Folly, The Heidi Chronicles
 Gregory Gale: Urinetown, The Wedding Singer
 Valentina: The Philadelphia Story
 Toni-Leslie James: Jelly's Last Jam, Footloose
 Tim Hatley: Spamalot, Shrek
 Hayden Ng who designed costumes for many Singapore's Theatre Productions.
 Eiko Ishioka: Spider-Man: Turn Off the Dark

Film and television

 Colleen Atwood: Chicago, Memoirs of a Geisha, Alice in Wonderland
 Cecil Beaton: My Fair Lady, Gigi
 Jenny Beavan: Howards End, Sense and Sensibility
 Milena Canonero: A Clockwork Orange, The Godfather Part III, Marie Antoinette
Ruth E Carter: Black Panther, Selma, The Butler, Sparkle, Bamboozled, Rosewood, Crooklyn, What's Love Got to Do With It, Do the Right Thing, School Daze
 Oleg Cassini: The Razor's Edge, The Ghost and Mrs. Muir, The Mating Season
 Ngila Dickson: The Lord of the Rings: The Return of the King, The Last Samurai
 Danilo Donati: Romeo and Juliet
 James Galanos: Oh Dad, Poor Dad, Mamma's Hung You in the Closet and I'm Feelin' So Sad, Never Wave at a WAC, Ginger in the Morning
 Adrian Greenburg: The Wizard of Oz, Marie Antoinette
 Julie Harris: Darling, A Hard Day's Night, Goodbye, Mr. Chips, The Slipper and the Rose
 Edith Head: Sabrina, The Sting, Lady in the Dark, The Emperor Waltz, The Hurricane
 Dorothy Jeakins: The Sound of Music
 Orry-Kelly: An American in Paris, Some Like It Hot, Gypsy
 Jean Louis: From Here to Eternity
 Deborah Nadoolman: Raiders of the Lost Ark, The Three Amigos, Michael Jackson's Thriller
Walter Plunkett: Gone with the Wind, Singin' in the Rain
 Sandy Powell: The Wings of the Dove, Shakespeare in Love
 Ann Roth: The English Patient
 Kazuhiro Sawataishi: 13 Assassins
 Irene Sharaff: Call Me Madam, Guys and Dolls
 William Travilla: How to Marry a Millionaire
 Theadora van Runkle: Bonnie and Clyde
 Jennifer von Mayrhauser: The Hand That Rocks the Cradle, The Private Lives of Pippa Lee
 Hazel Webb-Crozier: Mickybo and Me, Closing the Ring, Your Highness
 Jean-Pierre Dorleac: Somewhere in Time, The Blue Lagoon, Battlestar Galactica, Buck Rogers in the 25th Century, Heart and Souls, Quantum Leap
Neeta Lulla: Aur Pyaar Ho Gaya
Bhanu Athaiya: Gandhi, Pyaasa, C.I.D. (won Oscar for Gandhi)
Manish Malhotra: Tashan
Niharika Khan: Bhootnath, The Dirty Picture, Karthik Calling Karthik
Dolly Ahluwalia: Bajatey Raho, Bhaag Milkha Bhaag, Love Aaj Kal
Anaita Shroff Adajania: Love Aaj Kal, Dhoom 2
Simple Kapadia: RudaaliRudaali
Karan Johar: Kal Ho Naa Ho, Kabhi Alvida Naa Kehna
Bibi Russell: Mrittika Maya
Kanak Chapa Chakma: Jonakir Alo
Wahida Mollick Jolly: Mrittika Maya
Shimul Yusuf: Guerrilla

Theatre and Opera

 Madeleine Boyd: Pelléas et Mélisande, Orfeo ed Euridice, La Gazzetta, Partenope, Peter Grimes, La scala di seta
 Tilly Grimes, theatre, opera, and film

Others
 India Ferrah

See also
Costume design
Filmmaking
List of film formats
List of motion picture-related topics

External links 
 Costume Designers Guild

Mass media occupations

it:Costumista